Arts & Crafts Productions is a music-focused media and artist services company that offers information as an independent record label, management firm, merchandiser, and publisher worldwide. It has earned 21 Juno Awards. Arts & Crafts has been called one of Canada's most important record labels.

History

Founding 
Arts & Crafts (also referred to as "A&C") was launched as a music company in 2003 by friends Jeffrey Remedios & Daniel Cutler both former Virgin Records executives as well as Kevin Drew, who co-founded flagship group Broken Social Scene (BSS) with Brendan Canning. The partnership was originally intended as a vehicle for self-release and artist management of Broken Social Scene's breakthrough album You Forgot It in People, and the structure quickly formed as a platform to release albums and manage the careers of artists directly affiliated with members of Broken Social Scene. In addition to BSS albums the labels first releases were by Stars, Jason Collett, Feist, Apostle of Hustle and Valley of the Giants.

Growth 
In 2005 The Most Serene Republic was the first band unrelated to Broken Social Scene to sign to Arts & Crafts and officially marked a shift of scope broader than the projects related to Broken Social Scene.

A&C began its foray into the digital music business with the launch of GalleryAC.com, a boutique web store that offered digital downloads and Arts & Crafts related merchandise, in 2005.  They were one of the first labels to launch a digital download store.

In 2004, Remedios expanded the operation into Montreal basing himself out of the offices of DKD who later partnered to form Arts & Crafts International, releasing the gold selling album Set Yourself on Fire by Montreal-based group, Stars.

Arts & Crafts were among the first labels to offer a strategy for combating advance music leaks by offering Stars follow-up album  In Our Bedroom After the War for sale before promotional copies were ever manufactured and distributed by issuing wide release as a digital download only 3 days following album completion.

In 2009 Rolling Stone cited Remedios as a key insider reshaping the future of the music biz.

On 5 April 2017, Caroline Distribution became the US distributor for the Arts & Crafts label in the US. The label was previously distributed by RED Distribution in the US. EMI Music Canada previously distributed the label in Canada, when, in 2013, EMI Music Canada was merged into Universal Music Canada.

Recent history 
Arts & Crafts Music (also known as GalleryAC Music) controls or administers the publishing rights to much of the music released by the Arts & Crafts label.

On 14 January 2013, Arts & Crafts announced it would be holding the Field Trip Arts & Crafts Music Festival to commemorate their ten-year anniversary. Signed on to headline are Arts & Crafts labelmates Broken Social Scene, Feist, and Stars. Along with the festival celebration, Arts & Crafts released a rarities compilation titled, Arts & Crafts: 2003–2013. The compilation was released as a double album or four LPs and included selected rarities from across the Arts & Crafts catalog. A second compilation album, Arts & Crafts: X, was released in May and featured newly recorded collaborations between A&C artists.

The "Toronto Music Scene"
The 2009 release of This Book Is Broken (House of Anansi Press) documented the rise of Toronto indie bands, focusing especially on Broken Social Scene and the Arts & Crafts roster.

The Arts & Crafts Aesthetic
A design house, Arts & Crafts is well known for a consistent look and quality to all releases. Design and art are important to the company, and are taken as another medium of artistic expression that the label supports.

A&C has been nominated for five JUNO Awards for Album Artwork of the year.  In 2006 for Broken Social Scene: Broken Social Scene (Louise Upperton (Director/Designer); Christopher Mills, Kevin Drew, Justin Peroff (Illustrators)), in 2009 for Constantines: Kensington Heights (Dallas Wherle, Robyn Kotyk and Alex Vs. Alex). In 2011, Kotyk, Peroff, Charles Spearin, Joe McKay, Jimmy Collins and Elisabeth Chicoine were awarded the Recording Package of the Year Juno for Broken Social Scene's Forgiveness Rock Record box set and in 2012 for Timber Timbre's Creep on Creepin' On and Feist's Metals both earned nominations in the category.

In 2014, Arts & Crafts designers Kotyk, Peroff, and Petra Cuschieri won another Recording Package of the Year Juno Award for "Arts & Crafts: 2003–2013" 4x LP compilation album.

Gold & Platinum Certifications
Broken Social Scene Broken Social Scene

Stars Set Yourself On Fire

Broken Social Scene You Forgot It in People

Feist Let It Die

Feist The Reminder

Feist Metals

Awards and accolades

Juno Awards
The Juno Awards are presented by the Canadian Academy of Recording Arts and Sciences.

|-
|  || Broken Social Scene, You Forgot It in People || Alternative Album of the Year || 
|-
|rowspan="2"|   || Broken Social Scene, "Stars and Sons" || Video of the Year || 
|-
|| Stars, Heart || Alternative Album of the Year || 
|-
|rowspan="4"|  || Feist, "One Evening" || Video of the Year || 
|-
|| Feist, Let It Die || Alternative Album of the Year || 
|-
|| Feist || New Artist of the Year || 
|-
|| Stars, Set Yourself on Fire || Alternative Album of the Year || 
|-
|rowspan="3"|  ||rowspan="2"| Broken Social Scene, Broken Social Scene || Alternative Album of the Year || 
|-
| CD/DVD Artwork Design of the Year  || 
|-
|  Feist, "Inside and Out" || Single of the Year || 
|-
|rowspan="5"|  ||rowspan="2"| Feist, The Reminder || Album of the Year || 
|-
| Pop Album of the Year || 
|-
| Feist, "1,2,3,4" || Single of the Year || 
|-
| Feist || Songwriter of the Year || 
|-
| Feist || Artist of the Year || 
|-
|rowspan="5"|  || The Stills, Oceans Will Rise || Alternative Album of the Year || 
|-
|The Stills || New Group of the Year || 
|-
|  Constantines, Kensington Heights || Recording Package of the Year || 
|-
|  Feist  || Juno Fan Choice Award  || 
|-
| Feist, "Honey Honey" || Video of the Year || 
|-
|rowspan="5"|  || Amy Millan, Masters of the Burial || Adult Alternative Album of the Year || 
|-
| Amy Millan, Masters of the Burial || Recording Package of the Year || 
|-
| Bell Orchestre, As Seen Through Windows || Instrumental Album of the Year || 
|-
| Charles Spearin, The Happiness Project || Contemporary Jazz Album of the Year || 
|-
| The Most Serene Republic, "Heavens to Purgatory" || Video of the Year || 
|-
|rowspan="6"|  || Broken Social Scene, Forgiveness Rock Record ||  Alternative Album of the Year || 
|-
| Broken Social Scene ||  Group of the Year || 
|-
| Broken Social Scene, Forgiveness Rock Record || Recording Package of the Year || 
|-
| Broken Social Scene, This Movie Is Broken || Music DVD of the Year || 
|-
| Broken Social Scene, "Forced to Love" || Video of the Year || 
|-
| Chilly Gonzales, Ivory Tower || Electronic Album of the Year|| 
|-
|rowspan="10"|  || Dan Mangan, Oh Fortune || Alternative Album of the Year || 
|-
| Dan Mangan || New Artist of the Year || 
|-
| Dan Mangan || Songwriter of the Year || 
|-
| Dan Mangan, "Rows of Houses" || Video of the Year || 
|-
| Feist, Metals || Adult Alternative Album of the Year || 
|-
| Feist || Artist of the Year || 
|-
| Feist || Songwriter of the Year || 
|-
| Feist, Look at What the Light Did Now || Music DVD of the Year || 
|-
| Timber Timbre, Creep on Creepin' On || Alternative Album of the Year || 
|-
| Timber Timbre, Creep on Creepin' On || Recording Package of the Year || 
|-
|rowspan="2"|  || Trust ||  Electronic Artist of the Year || 
|-
| Cold Specks || Breakthrough Artist of the Year || 
|-
|rowspan="3"|  || Arts & Crafts: 2003–2013 ||  Recording Package of the Year || 
|-
| Hayden, Us Alone  ||  Adult Alternative Album of the Year || 
|-
| The Darcys, Warring  ||  Alternative Album of the Year || 
|-
|rowspan="2"|  || Timber Timbre, Hot Dreams || Alternative Album of the Year || 
|-
| Timber Timbre, Hot Dreams || Recording Package of the Year || 
|-
|rowspan="3"|  || Tobias Jesso Jr.,  Goon ||  Adult Alternative Album of the Year || 
|-
| Frazey Ford, Indian Ocean ||  Contemporary Roots Album of the Year || 
|-
| Dan Mangan + Blacksmith, Club Meds ||  Recording Package of the Year || 
|-
|rowspan="8"|  || Andy Shauf ||  Breakthrough Artist of the Year || 
|-
| Gord Downie ||  Songwriter of the Year || 
|-
| Andy Shauf, The Party ||  Adult Alternative Album of the Year || 
|-
| Gord Downie, Secret Path ||  Adult Alternative Album of the Year || 
|-
| Jacques Greene, You Can't Deny ||  Dance Recording of the Year || 
|-
| Andy Shauf, The Party ||  Recording Engineer of the Year || 
|-
| Gord Downie, Secret Path ||  Recording Package of the Year || 
|-
| Gord Downie, "The Stranger" ||  Video of the Year || 
|-
|rowspan="6"|  || Broken Social Scene ||  Breakthrough Artist of the Year || 
|-
| Gord Downie, Introduce Yerself ||  Adult Alternative Album of the Year || 
|-
| Gord Downie ||  Artist of the Year || 
|-
| Timber Timbre, Sincerely, Future Pollution ||  Adult Alternative Album of the Year || 
|-
| Gord Downie + Kevin Drew ||  Songwriter of the Year || 
|-
| Kid Koala, Music To Draw To: Satellite ||  Electronic Album of the Year || 
|-
|rowspan="4"|  || Dan Mangan, More or Less ||  Adult Alternative Album of the Year || 
|-
| Fucked Up, Dose Your Dreams ||  Alternative Album of the Year || 
|-
| Jacques Greene, Avatar Beach ||  Dance Recording of the Year || 
|-
| Said The Whale, UnAmerican ||  Recording Engineer of the Year ||

Polaris Music Prize
The Polaris Music Prize is awarded annually to the best full-length Canadian album based on artistic merit.

|-
|  || Broken Social Scene, Broken Social Scene || Polaris Music Prize || 
|-
|  || Feist, The Reminder || Polaris Music Prize || 
|-
|  || Stars, In Our Bedroom After the War || Polaris Music Prize || 
|-
|  || Broken Social Scene, Forgiveness Rock Record || Polaris Music Prize || 
|-
|  || Timber Timbre, Creep on Creepin' On || Polaris Music Prize || 
|-
|  || Cold Specks, I Predict a Graceful Expulsion || Polaris Music Prize || 
|-
|  || Feist, Metals || Polaris Music Prize || 
|-
|  || Timber Timbre, Hot Dreams || Polaris Music Prize || 
|-
|  || Tobias Jesso Jr, Goon || Polaris Music Prize || 
|-
|  || Andy Shauf, The Party || Polaris Music Prize || 
|-
|  || Gord Downie, Secret Path || Polaris Music Prize || 
|-
|  || Jean-Michel Blais, Dans ma main || Polaris Music Prize || 
|-
|  || nêhiyawak, nipiy || Polaris Music Prize ||

Canadian Music Awards
The Canadian Music and Broadcast Industry Awards happen every March in Toronto as part of Canadian Music Week.

|-
| 2008 || Arts & Crafts || Independent Label of the Year || 
|-
| 2009 || Arts & Crafts || Independent Label of the Year || 
|-
| 2011 || Arts & Crafts || Independent Label of the Year || 
|-
| 2012 || Arts & Crafts || Independent Label of the Year || 
|-
| 2013 || Arts & Crafts || Management Company of the Year || 
|-
| 2014 || Arts & Crafts || Management Company of the Year ||

Other ventures
In 2008 Arts & Crafts opened Arts & Crafts México and are recognized as the first independent music company to focus on the independent music market in Mexico, releasing albums by the A&C North American roster as well as being the Mexican home to a number of other successful artists such as Sonic Youth, Bright Eyes, M. Ward, Metric, and The Dears.

Artists

 The American Analog Set
 Aphasia
 Apostle of Hustle
 Astral Swans
 BadBadNotGood (Canada only)
 Tim Baker
 Bam Bam (Mexico only)
 Bell Orchestre
 Black English (Canada only)
 Jean-Michel Blais
 Bloc Party (Canada only)
 Broken Social Scene
 Busty and the Bass
 Carca (Mexico only)
 Matthew Cardinal
 Chikita Violenta
 Chilly Gonzales
 Cold Specks (Canada only)
 Jason Collett
 Constantines
 The Cribs (North America only)
 The Darcys
 The Dears (Currently Mexico only)
 Deer Tick (Canada only)
 Seán Devlin
 Gord Downie and the Sadies
 The Drums (Canada only)
 Ellevator
 Farao (Canada only)
 Feist (Canada only)
 Fleet Foxes (Mexico only)
 Foxwarren
 FRIGS 
 Fucked Up (Canada only)
 Girls (Mexico only)
 Gold & Youth
 Hayden
 HAERTS
 Georgia Harmer
 Sarah Harmer
 The Hidden Cameras
 Charlie Houston
 In the Valley Below (Canada only)
 Japandroids (Canada only)
 Tobias Jesso Jr (Canada only)
 Kid Koala
 Andy Kim
 La Force
 Leif Erikson
 Liza Anne
 Los Campesinos! (North America only)
 Calvin Love
 Lowell
 Mia Maestro
 Dan Mangan
 Majical Cloudz (Canada only)
 Memphis
 Metric (Mexico only)
 Amy Millan
 Moby (Canada only)
 The Most Serene Republic
 nêhiyawak
 Neon Indian (Mexico only)
 No Joy (Canada only)
 OMBIIGIZI
 Overcoats
 Pavement (Mexico only)
 Phoenix (North America only)
 Julian Plenti (Mexico only)
 Ra Ra Riot (Canada only)
 Jay Reatard (Mexico only)
 Reuben and the Dark
 Rey Pila
 Lucy Rose
 Röyksopp (Canada only)
 Said the Whale
 Sally Seltmann aka New Buffalo
 Andy Shauf (Canada only)
 Samantha Savage Smith
 Snowblink
 Charles Spearin
 Stars
 Stephen Malkmus and the Jicks
 Still Life Still
 The Stills
 Tamino (Canada/US only)
 Tei Shi
 Timber Timbre
 Torres
 TR/ST
 Tricky
 Valley of the Giants
 Walrus
 M. Ward (Mexico only)
 Washed Out
 Win Win
 Years
 Yo La Tengo (Mexico only)
 Young Galaxy
 Zeus
 Zulu Winter (Canada & Mexico only)

References

External links

  (Canada)
  (Mexico)

 
Record labels established in 2002
Canadian independent record labels
Indie rock record labels
Alternative rock record labels
Companies based in Toronto
Netlabels
2002 establishments in Ontario
Online music stores of Canada